Malta participated in the Eurovision Song Contest 2019 with the song "Chameleon" written by Joacim Persson, Paula Winger, Borislav Milanov and Johan Alkenäs. The song was performed by Michela Pace. The Maltese entry for the 2019 contest in Tel Aviv, Israel, was selected through the first season of the music competition X Factor Malta, organised by the Maltese broadcaster Public Broadcasting Services (PBS). The competition concluded with a final on 26 January 2019 where Michela Pace eventually emerged as the winner. The song Pace would perform at the Eurovision Song Contest, "Chameleon", was internally selected and was released to the public on 10 March.

Malta was drawn to compete in the second semi-final of the Eurovision Song Contest which took place on 16 May 2019. Performing during the show in position 11, "Chameleon" was announced among the top 10 entries of the first semi-final and therefore qualified to compete in the final on 18 May. It was later revealed that Malta placed eighth out of the 18 participating countries in the semi-final with 157 points. In the final, Malta performed as the opening entry in position 1 and placed fourteenth out of the 26 participating countries, scoring 107 points.

Background 

Prior to the 2019 contest, Malta had participated in the Eurovision Song Contest thirty-one times since its first entry in 1971. Malta briefly competed in the Eurovision Song Contest in the 1970s before withdrawing for sixteen years. The country had, to this point, competed in every contest since returning in 1991. Malta's best placing in the contest thus far was second, which it achieved on two occasions: in 2002 with the song "7th Wonder" performed by Ira Losco and in the 2005 contest with the song "Angel" performed by Chiara. In the 2018 edition, Malta failed to qualify to the final with the song "Taboo" performed by Christabelle.

For the 2019 contest, the Maltese national broadcaster, Public Broadcasting Services (PBS), broadcast the event within Malta and organised the selection process for the nation's entry. PBS confirmed their intentions to participate at it on 20 June 2018. Malta selected their entry consistently through a national final procedure with several artists to choose both the song and performer, however PBS announced that they would utilise the newly created talent show format X Factor Malta for their 2019 participation, which would result in the selection of a winning performer that would subsequently be given an internally selected song to perform at Eurovision.

Before Eurovision

X Factor Malta 

The Maltese artist for the Eurovision Song Contest 2019 was selected through the first season of X Factor Malta, the Maltese version of the British television reality music competition The X Factor created by Simon Cowell. The first season premiered on 7 October 2018 and concluded with a final on 26 January 2019. In addition to selecting the Maltese Eurovision entrant, the winner also secured a record contract with Sony Music Italy. All shows in the competition were hosted by actor Ben Camille and broadcast on Television Malta (TVM) as well on the broadcaster's website tvm.com.mt.

Selection process 
Acts were able to submit their applications starting from 26 June 2018 either via an online submission form, by Whatsapp messaging a video audition or by attending pop-up auditions held across Malta. Producers auditions took place between 13 and 15 July 2018 at Fort St. Elmo where the show's producers assessed the auditioning acts and determined those that would progress through the selection process. The chosen auditionees were invited back to the last set of auditions that took place in front of the judges between 1 and 8 August 2018 at Fort St. Angelo. The four judges were:
 Ira Losco – Singer-songwriter, represented Malta at the Eurovision Song Contest in the 2002 and 2016 editions 
 Howard Keith Debono – Music producer
 Ray Mercieca – Singer-songwriter and musician, lead singer of the band The Rifffs
 Alexandra Alden – Singer-songwriter

120 contestants were selected by the judges to progress to the bootcamp round, which they were split into the four category groups - Boys, Girls, Overs and Groups, and were given one song to sing a cappella. 30 acts were eliminated and the remaining 90 acts each selected a song from the Wall of Songs, which they had to perform with three others who had selected the same song. In the final challenge, the remaining acts, including newly formed groups, performed a song of their own choice and the judges selected 48 acts, 12 from each category, to go through to the Six Chair Challenge filmed at the Malta Fairs & Conventions Centre in Attard on 11 and 12 October 2018. 24 acts advanced to the Judges' Houses, broadcast on 23 and 30 December 2018, during which the four judges eliminated 3 acts from each category with a total of 12 acts advancing to the live shows.

Live shows
Key:
 – Winner
 – Runner-up
 – Third Place

Song selection 
On 10 March 2019, PBS announced that Michela Pace would perform the song "Chameleon" at the Eurovision Song Contest 2019 through the decision of several jury groups and music industry experts from 300 song submissions that were received by the broadcaster. "Chameleon" was written by members of the songwriting team Symphonix International, Joacim Persson, Paula Winger, Borislav Milanov and Johan Alkanäs. The release of the song and official music video was made available online on the broadcaster's website tvm.com.mt and the official Eurovision Song Contest website eurovision.tv.

At Eurovision
According to Eurovision rules, all nations with the exceptions of the host country and the "Big Five" (France, Germany, Italy, Spain and the United Kingdom) are required to qualify from one of two semi-finals in order to compete for the final; the top ten countries from each semi-final progress to the final. The European Broadcasting Union (EBU) split up the competing countries into six different pots based on voting patterns from previous contests, with countries with favourable voting histories put into the same pot. On 28 January 2019, a special allocation draw was held which placed each country into one of the two semi-finals, as well as which half of the show they would perform in. Malta was placed into the second semi-final, to be held on 16 May 2019, and was scheduled to perform in the second half of the show.

Once all the competing songs for the 2019 contest had been released, the running order for the semi-finals was decided by the shows' producers rather than through another draw, so that similar songs were not placed next to each other. Malta was set to perform in position 11, following the entry from Croatia and preceding the entry from Lithuania.

The song passed to the final round of the 2019 Eurovision Song Contest, when it was announced as the last entry to make it through from the second semi-final, where songs were announced in random order.

Semi-final
Malta performed eleventh in the second semi-final, following the entry from Croatia and preceding the entry from Lithuania. At the end of the show, Malta was announced as having finished in the top 10 and subsequently qualifying for the grand final. It was later revealed that Malta placed eighth in the semi-final, receiving a total of 157 points: 50 points from the televoting and 107 points from the juries.

Voting
Voting during the three shows involved each country awarding two sets of points from 1-8, 10 and 12: one from their professional jury and the other from televoting. Each nation's jury consisted of five music industry professionals who are citizens of the country they represent, with their names published before the contest to ensure transparency. This jury judged each entry based on: vocal capacity; the stage performance; the song's composition and originality; and the overall impression by the act. In addition, no member of a national jury was permitted to be related in any way to any of the competing acts in such a way that they cannot vote impartially and independently. The individual rankings of each jury member as well as the nation's televoting results will be released shortly after the grand final.

Points awarded to Malta

Points awarded by Malta

Detailed voting results
The following members comprised the Maltese jury:
 Carlo Borg Bonaci (jury chairperson)broadcaster
 Arthur Caruanachannel manager
 Nicole Frendostudent, singer
 Matthew James Borgsinger, songwriter, producer
 Eileen Ann Spiterilogistics executive producer

References

2019
Countries in the Eurovision Song Contest 2019
Eurovision